Go Ahead Punk... Make My Day is a 1996 compilation album released on the Nitro Records label. The title is a reference to the Dirty Harry quote "Go ahead, make my day".

Only five bands appear on this compilation, with each band represented twice. All tracks sample current releases by Nitro Records artists, with the exception of "Hey Joe" by the Offspring, which is a previously unreleased recording.

Track listing

References

External links
Go Ahead Punk... Make My Day on Nitro Records

1996 compilation albums
Punk rock compilation albums
Nitro Records compilation albums